Sir John Northcote, 1st Baronet (1599 – 24 June 1676) was an English politician who sat in the House of Commons at various times between 1640 and 1676. He supported the Parliamentarian cause in the English Civil War.

Origins
Northcote was the eldest surviving son of John Northcote (1570-1632) of Hayne, Newton St Cyres, near Crediton, Devon, (whose splendid monument he erected in Newton St Cyres Church) by his second wife Susanna Pollard, daughter of Sir Hugh II Pollard of King's Nympton. The family of Northcote originated in Devon at the Domesday Book manor of Northcote in the parish of East Down in North Devon. The Heraldic Visitations of Devon lists the founder of the family as Galfridus de Northcote, Miles ("knight"), living in 1103. The family later in the 16th century made its fortune as cloth merchants at Crediton

Education
He matriculated at Exeter College, Oxford on 9 May 1617, aged 16 and was a student of Middle Temple in 1618.

Career
In November 1640 he was elected Member of Parliament for the newly re-established borough of Ashburton in the Long Parliament. On 16 July 1641, he was created a baronet.

Having Presbyterian sympathies, on the outbreak of the Civil War, he declared for Parliament, and used his considerable wealth and influence to aid the cause. In 1642 he provided £450 to finance military action in Ireland, and in June promised more money and troops for the war in England. His actions were sufficiently notable for him to be excluded by name from the general pardon issued in November 1642 by King Charles I. In 1643 Sir John was leading a regiment of 1,200 men in Devon, and was taken prisoner by royal forces after the surrender of Exeter in September 1643.

Northcote was kept captive until the autumn of 1644, when he was exchanged, and resumed his Parliamentary seat in May 1645. He subscribed to the Covenant, and was excluded from Parliament in Pride's Purge in December 1648, but returned to the House of Commons once more as Member for Devon in all three Parliaments of the Protectorate. In the last of these, during Richard Cromwell's rule, he was a frequent speaker, and after the restoration of the Rump Parliament he took a leading role in organising a petition from Devon to the Speaker that the vacant seats should be filled. In the Convention Parliament of 1660 he was elected both for Devon and for Helston, though his return for the latter was ruled void. He subsequently sat also for Barnstaple from 1667 until his death.

A manuscript purporting to be the Notebook of Sir John Northcote, containing Memoranda of Proceedings during the first session of the Long Parliament, 1640 was published in 1887. However, its authenticity was challenged on the grounds that it covered a period before Sir John had a seat in the House.

Marriage and children

Northcote married Grace Halswell (died 1675), a daughter and heiress of Hugh Halswell (d.1626) of Chamberlain Street, Wells, Somerset, by his wife and cousin Elizabeth Brounkard. Hugh was the son of Richard Halswell and Cicely Reeves, and grandson of Robert Halswell (d.1570) of Halswell, Somerset. Northcote had by Grace seven sons and four daughters: 
Sir Arthur Northcote, 2nd Baronet (1628-1688), eldest son and heir.
John Northcote (b.1629), 2nd son, married Catherine Foljambe.
Lewis Northcote, 3rd son, married Jane Copleston
Hugh Northcote (b.1635), apparently died young
Halswell Northcote (b.1639), 4th son, married Mary Crooke.
William I Northcote (1642-3), died young
William II Northcote (b.1648), married Alice Leigh
Susanna Northcote (b.1633), married in 1653, as his 2nd wife, Col. Robert Fortescue (1617-1677), 2nd son of Hugh Fortescue (1593-1663) of Filleigh by his wife Mary Rolle, daughter of Robert Rolle (d.1633) of Heanton Satchville, Petrockstowe. Their only son Robert Fortescue (1633-1633), died an infant, whose mural monument exists in Newton St Cyres Church. Of their three daughters, two died as infants, but the eldest Elizabeth Fortescue (born 1659) survived and married George Horner (1646-1707) of Mells Manor in Somerset, and was the grandmother of Elizabeth Fox, Countess of Ilchester. The daughter from Robert Fortescue's first marriage to Grace Grenville, daughter of Sir Bevil Grenville was Grace Fortescue who married Sir Halswell Tynte, 1st Baronet (1649–1702), MP for Bridgwater 1679–1689. Tynte was a cousin of Grace Halswell, being the son of Jane Halswell (d.1650) (sole heiress of Rev. Hugh Halswell (d.1672) of Halswell), the wife of John Tynte, whose inheritance became the manor of Halswell.
Grace I Northcote (1632-1632), died young
Elizabeth Northcote (b.1638), married Thomas Pointingdon. 
Grace II Northcote (1641-1660)

Sources
Vivian, Lt.Col. J.L., (Ed.) The Visitations of the County of Devon: Comprising the Heralds' Visitations of 1531, 1564 & 1620, Exeter, 1895, p. 582, pedigree of Northcote

Further reading
Helms, M. W., biography of Sir John Northcote published in History of Parliament: House of Commons 1660–1690, ed. B.D. Henning, 1983

References

 
D. Brunton & D. H. Pennington, Members of the Long Parliament (London: George Allen & Unwin, 1954)
Cobbett's Parliamentary history of England, from the Norman Conquest in 1066 to the year 1803 (London: Thomas Hansard, 1808) 
 Burke's Peerage and Baronetage (London: Henry Colburn & Richard Bentley, 1832) 
 Edward Kimber & Richard Johnson, The Baronetage of England (London, 1771)

External links
Notebook of Sir John Northcote (Internet Archive)

|-

1599 births
1676 deaths
Northcote, John, 1st Baronet
Alumni of Exeter College, Oxford
Members of the Inner Temple
High Sheriffs of Devon
Roundheads
English MPs 1640–1648
English MPs 1654–1655
English MPs 1656–1658
English MPs 1659
English MPs 1660
English MPs 1661–1679
Members of the Parliament of England (pre-1707) for Devon
Members of the Parliament of England (pre-1707) for Barnstaple
Members of the Parliament of England for Ashburton